Frank Stringfellow (1840 – June 8, 1913) was a Confederate officer and spy who survived the American Civil War, and married the sweetheart for whom he repeatedly risked his life to court – Emma Green. After the war Stringfellow married Green, and became an Episcopal minister.

Shortly after joining the Confederate Army, Stringfellow became the "personal scout" for Confederate General J.E.B. Stuart. He crossed into Union territory on multiple missions, until the Union placed a $10,000 reward for his capture.

American Civil War

When war broke out, Stringfellow sought a commission in the Confederate Army. Despite four denials due to his fragile health (and 94 pound weight), Stringfellow eventually secured a commission as Captain in the 4th Virginia Cavalry (his brothers also served the Confederacy, although his cousins Pleasant and Robert Stringfellow served in the U.S. Army). Stringfellow rode with General J.E.B. Stuart at Seven Pines, Cold Harbor, and the raid at Catlett's Station. Stringfellow also rode with Colonel John Singleton Mosby of the 43rd Virginia Cavalry, most notably in the raid at Loudoun Heights on January 9, 1864.

However, Stringfellow's fame derived from his confidential service, sometimes directly for General Robert E. Lee, but much through J.E.B. Stuart until his death in March 1864. By the end of the war, Stringfellow was known as the most dangerous man in the Confederacy, with a $10,000 bounty placed on his head. Stringfellow posed as a dental assistant in Alexandria, Virginia and gathered intelligence, and later even obtained a dental license and did the same in Washington, D.C. Unlike the plot line of the PBS drama Mercy Street, there is no evidence that Stringfellow was involved in any attempt on the life of President Abraham Lincoln.

Postbellum

Stringfellow refused to take the loyalty oath after the war and moved to Canada. He returned to Alexandria, Virginia in 1867, enrolling at what became the Virginia Theological Seminary and marrying his high school sweetheart, Emma Green with whom he had four children: Ida (born 1867), Alice Lee (Born 1871), Frank (born 1881) and John Stanton (born 1883).

After graduating, from Virginia Theological Seminary, he was ordained an Episcopal priest in 1876.  Rev. Stringfellow served in various parishes in Virginia, including in Franklin, Patrick, and Henry Counties. As rector, Rev. Stringfellow led the campaign that built Christ Episcopal Church in Martinsville in the 1890s, but moved on soon after the building was finished. At age 57, Rev. Stringfellow enlisted as a chaplain in the U.S. Army, after obtaining a reference from former President Grant, who noted Stringfellow had refrained from shooting him years earlier. During the Spanish–American War in 1898, Stringfellow served as a minister for the camps. He considered ministry among fellow Confederate veterans as his mission, and often regaled audiences with stories about his military escapades. He also became the first chaplain of the Woodberry Forest School, a male boarding school in Madison, Virginia, which had been established by a fellow Mosby Ranger in 1889.

During his postwar years, Stringfellow maintained contact with his Civil War era acquaintances. Notably, he continued correspondence with Jefferson Davis regarding the nature of the Confederate government during the war years.

Stringfellow ultimately retired to Alexandria. He died in Lindsay, Virginia on June 8, 1913, and is buried beside his wife Emma at Ivy Hill Cemetery in Alexandria, Virginia.

Mercy Street

Stringfellow was one of the characters in a PBS historical drama entitled Mercy Street and was played by Jack Falahee.

See also
 Mary Phinney
 Emma Green

References

External links
 

1840 births
1913 deaths
19th-century American Episcopalians
American Episcopal priests
People of Virginia in the American Civil War
American Civil War spies
Virginia Theological Seminary alumni
Burials at Ivy Hill Cemetery (Alexandria, Virginia)
People from Culpeper County, Virginia